William Hollister may refer to:

William Howard Hollister of the Hollister brothers, American sailors of World War II
William Welles Hollister, 19th century California landowner